Pyroderces brosi is a moth in the family Cosmopterigidae. It is found in Italy.

The wingspan is about 13 mm. Adults have been recorded in June.

References

Moths described in 1969
brosi
Endemic fauna of Italy
Moths of Europe